Demond or DeMond is a given name and surname. Notable people with the name include:

First names
Demond Greene (born 1979), dual German-American citizen and professional basketball player
Demond Mallet (born 1978), American professional basketball player
Demond Wilson (born 1946), American actor, now a minister

Other names
Dash Demond
Michael DeMond Davis (1939–2003), pioneer in African American journalism
Reverend Abraham Lincoln DeMond (born 1867), advocate for African American emancipation